Vadaperumbakkam, is a developing residential area in North Chennai, a metropolitan city in Tamil Nadu, India. On 2011, Vadaperumbakkam Merged with Chennai Corporation.

Surroundings

Vadaperumbakkam was an agricultural village before the year 2000. After 2005, the industrial and Godown development started and developed quickly. On 2011, Vaperumbakkam merged with Chennai Corporation (City Limit) due to its fast development. It is surrounded by Madhavaram, Puzhal and Perambur. It is an industrial area as the vicinity is mostly of godowns and industries. However it yet to be declared as one. The gutka packets in the famous gutka scam which happened in Chennai was stored in a here godown here.

External links
Corporation of Chennai

Neighbourhoods in Chennai